Institute under State Legislature Act is a type of university-level institution in India, established or incorporated by a state legislature act. Although such institutes do not come under the higher education department of the state and are run and funded by another department, they enjoy academic status and privileges like state universities.
Other categories of university-level institutions in India including central university, state university, private university, deemed university.

University Grants Commission (UGC) Act
Under the University Grants Commission (UGC) Act, 1956, "University" means a university established or incorporated by or under a Central Act, a Provincial Act or a State Act, and includes any such institution as may, in consultation with the university concerned, be recognized by the Commission in accordance with the regulations made in this behalf under this Act.

List of Institutes under State Legislature Act

There are 6 Institutes under State Legislature Act in India:

References